Arrowsmith or Arrowsmiths may refer to:
 A person who makes arrows (see fletching and bowyer) 
 Arrowsmith (novel), by Sinclair Lewis
 Arrowsmith (film), 1931 adaptation of the novel
 Arrowsmith (comics)
 Arrowsmith, players of Darts
 The Arrowsmith Program, a brain training program for students with learning disabilities
 Arrowsmith School, a school for children with learning disabilities
 Arrowsmith Holidays, a British holiday tour operator later part of Laker Airways
 J. W. Arrowsmith, British book printer, publisher, and imprint
 Arrowsmith System, a knowledge discovery system

People
 Arrowsmith (surname)

Places
 Arrowsmith Peninsula, Antarctica
 Mount Arrowsmith (disambiguation), mountains in Canada, Antarctica, and New Zealand
 Arrowsmith, Western Australia, a town
 Arrowsmith River, a river in Western Australia
River Arrowsmith (Queensland), later renamed Coomera River, Australia
 Arrowsmith Township, McLean County, Illinois
 Arrowsmith, Illinois, a village in the township
 Arrowsmiths, Ohio, an extinct town